Gail Mooney (born December 14, 1960) is an American politician who served in the North Dakota House of Representatives from the 20th district from 2012 to 2016.

References

1960 births
Living people
Democratic Party members of the North Dakota House of Representatives